The North Pennsylvania Railroad was a railroad company which served Philadelphia, Montgomery County, Bucks County and Northampton County in Pennsylvania. It was formed in 1852, and began operation in 1855. The Philadelphia and Reading Railway, predecessor to the Reading Company, leased the North Pennsylvania in 1879. Its tracks were transferred to Conrail and the Southeastern Pennsylvania Transportation Authority (SEPTA) in 1976.

History

The company incorporated on April 8, 1852, as the Philadelphia, Easton and Water Gap. Construction began on June 16, 1853; the company changed its name to the North Pennsylvania Railroad on October 3 that year. The new name reflected the grand (and unrealized) ambitions of the company to extend all the way across Pennsylvania to Waverly, New York and a junction with the Erie Railroad. On October 7 the Doylestown Branch opened to Doylestown via Lansdale. Within Philadelphia, the company's passenger depot was located at Third and Berks; tracks continued south to a freight depot at Willow and Front street on the waterfront.

In 1856, the company suffered its first accident in the Great Train Wreck of 1856, the most significant railroad wreck in the world up to that time. The railroad continued to expand northward from Philadelphia. The main line reached Bethlehem, running parallel to the Bethlehem Pike, on July 7, 1857. At Bethlehem the railroad interchanged with the Lehigh Valley Railroad. The Shimersville Branch, from Iron Hill to Shimersville on the Lehigh Valley Railroad east of Bethlehem, opened on January 1, 1857. The branch carried little traffic; the North Pennsylvania leased it that same year to the Lehigh Valley and Delaware Water Gap Railroad as part of a stillborn venture to build a new route through Easton to a junction with the Delaware, Lackawanna and Western Railroad. By the time of the Reading lease the branch was out of service.

The company built, with the Delaware and Bound Brook Railroad, a line from Jenkintown to Bound Brook, New Jersey, creating a new route between Philadelphia and New York. The Delaware River Branch opened on May 1, 1876, in time for the Centennial Exposition.

Reading control 

The Philadelphia & Reading Railway leased North Pennsylvania Railroad on May 14, 1879. The North Pennsylvania continued to exist as a company, and would be merged along with the Reading into Conrail in 1976 as a result of the Reading's final bankruptcy. Most of the North Pennsylvania's lines continue to exist:
 The main line became the Reading's Bethlehem Branch; through passenger service continued under SEPTA until 1981. The line is out of service north of Quakertown and south of Fern Rock, Philadelphia. SEPTA operates Lansdale/Doylestown Line commuter trains to Doylestown. Freight trains are operated on the portion from Lansdale to Quakertown by Pennsylvania Northeastern Railroad and East Penn Railroad.
 The Delaware River Branch became the New York Branch; the Reading also leased the Delaware and Bound Brook Railroad. Through passenger service to Jersey City ended in 1981; SEPTA West Trenton Line trains continue to operate as far as West Trenton. The line remains open for freight use as part of CSX's Trenton Subdivision.
 The North East Pennsylvania Railroad's route became the New Hope Branch; SEPTA's Warminster Line trains run as far as Warminster. The New Hope Railroad owns and operates Warminster–New Hope.
 The Stony Creek Railroad became the Stony Creek Branch under the Reading. SEPTA operates the Manayunk/Norristown Line here from Norristown Transportation Center to Elm Street, while CSX has trackage rights.

See also
List of railroads transferred to Conrail

Notes

References

External links
Finding aid for North Pennsylvania Railroad Company records at Hagley Museum and Library

Companies affiliated with the Reading Company
Defunct Pennsylvania railroads
Railroads transferred to Conrail
Railway companies established in 1852
Railway companies disestablished in 1976
1852 establishments in Pennsylvania